Tzucacab Municipality is one of the 106 subdivisions of the State of Yucatán in Mexico. It has a municipal seat of the same name.

Location
Tzucacab Municipality is located in the southern region of the state and falls between latitudes 19° 38' and 20° 09' north and longitudes 88° 59' and 89° 14' west.

Climate

Communities
The municipality is made up of 40 different communities, of which the most important are:

 Tzucacab (Municipal Seat)
 Catmis
 Ekbalam
 Corral
 Noh-Bec

Architectural landmarks

The Church of St. Francis Xavier, located in the municipal seat Tzucacab, dates back to the colonial era.

References 

Municipalities of Yucatán